"Real Love" is a song by English singer-songwriter Lee Ryan from his debut solo album, Lee Ryan (2005). It was released as the fourth and final single from the album in 2006. The song was originally produced by Cutfather & Joe, Ash Howes, Martin Harrington, and Remee, and it was remixed by Brian Rawling and Paul Meehan for its single release. "Real Love" was not released in Ryan's native United Kingdom, due to the lack of sales for Ryan's previous singles. The track received attention for its use as the theme song for the UK release of the film Ice Age: The Meltdown. The song peaked at No. 57 in Italy and No. 72 in Switzerland.

In 2008, the song was covered by Katharine McPhee and Elliott Yamin for Randy Jackson's debut album Randy Jackson's Music Club, Vol. 1. The song was released on 21 April 2008 and served as the second single from the album. According to USA Today, the song has sold 8,000 copies as of June 2008.

Track listing
CD single'''
 "Real Love" – 3:07
 "Real Love" (Sharp Boys club mix) – 7:32

Credits and personnel
Songwriting – John Reid, Joe Belmaati,  Mich Hansen, Remee
Production – Cutfather & Joe, Ash Howes, Martin Harrington, Remee
Additional production – Brian Rawling, Paul Meehan
Engineer – David Treahearn, Rob Haggett
Guitar – Adam Phillips
Bass – Stefan Olsson
Keyboards – Paul Meehan
Mixer – Matt Furmidge, Mike Nocito

Credits adapted from CD single liner notes.

Charts

References

2005 songs
2006 singles
Lee Ryan songs
Sony BMG singles
Songs written by Remee
Songs written by Cutfather
Song recordings produced by Brian Rawling